Herbert Léonard (born 25 February 1945 in Strasbourg, France) né Hubert Lœnhard is principally known as a singer, however, he is also a specialist of Russian airplanes from World War II. His first success "Quelque chose tient mon cœur" (Somethings Got A Hold of My Heart) opened the doors of the hit-parade to him in 1968.

His 1982 album Ça donne envie d'aimer and the sing "Amoureux fous" was done in a duo with Julie Pietri, perpetuating his image as a crooner.

Discography 
 Si je ne t'aimais qu'un peu (1967)
 Quelque chose tient mon cœur (1968)
 Tel quel (1969)
 Trois pas dans le silence (1971)
 grands succès (1977)
 Pour le plaisir (1981)
 Ca donne envie d'aimer (1982)
 Commencez sans moi (1984)
 Mon cœur et ma maison (1985)
 Laissez-nous rêver (1987)
 Olympia (1988)
 Je suis un grand sentimental (1989)
 Herbert Léonard (1991)
 Une certaine idée de l'amour (1993)
 Notes intimes (1995)
 Le meilleur de Herbert Léonard (1998)
 Si j'avais un peu d'orgueil (1998)
 Ils s'aiment (2000)
 Génériquement vôtre (2001)
 Aimer une femme (2002)
 Entre charme et beauté (2004)
 Déclarations d'amour (2012)
 Mise à jour (50 ans de carrière) (2016)

External links
  Official site

1945 births
French male singers
Living people
Musicians from Strasbourg